Churna (Sanskrit: चूर्ण "powder") is a mixture of powdered herbs and or minerals used in Ayurvedic medicine. Triphala is an example of a classic Ayurvedic formula, used for thousands of years that is made from the powders of three fruits Amalaki (Emblica officinalis), Haritaki (Terminalia chebula) and Bibhitaki (Terminalia belerica).

References 

Ayurvedic medicaments
Mind–body interventions